Rasputitsa is a season of the year when travel on unpaved roads or across country becomes difficult, owing to muddy conditions from rain or melting snow.

Etymology 
 is derived from the root: путь (put, [putʼ]), means "road" or "way" or "travel"; + рас- (ras, [ʀas]) - is a word prefix, means "discrepancy" or "divergence"; + -иц (-its, [it͡s]) is a diminutive suffix; + а ([a]) is a feminine noun ending. In Russia, the term   refers to two periods during the year – the spring and autumn – and also refers to road conditions during such a period.

The Ukrainian equivalent  usually refers to spring, and occasionally to autumn, when rain and/or melting snow on unpaved roads, tracks, paths, or any poorly-drained off-road area turns the route into impassable deep mud.

Similar terms are Swedish  "bad going" and Finnish  "broken state of roads", but both also apply to when water is too iced over for boats but not strong enough to cross on foot or in other vehicles.

Effects 

The term is applied to muddy road conditions in Belarus, Russia, and Ukraine, which are caused by the poor drainage of underlying clay-laden soils found in the region. Roads are subject to weight limitations and closures during the period in certain districts of Russia. The phenomenon was a hindrance in the early 20th century in the Soviet Union since 40% of rural villages were not served by paved roads.

 seasons of Russia are well known as a defensive advantage in wartime. Common nicknames include "General Mud" and "Marshal Mud". A spring thaw probably saved Novgorod from conquest and sacking during the 13th-century Mongol invasion of Kievan Rus'. The mud was a great hindrance during the French invasion of Russia in 1812.

On the Eastern Front during the Second World War, the months-long muddy period slowed the German advance into the Soviet Union during the Battle of Moscow (October 1941 to January 1942) and may have helped save the Soviet capital from German occupation. The advent of Blitzkrieg had the disadvantage that while tanks could operate effectively in summer or in winter, they proved less useful in spring and autumn,  when the functioning of an efficient railway system came into its own.

Prior to the 2022 Russian invasion of Ukraine, some analysts identified the logistical challenges of the mud season as a likely hindrance to any large-scale invasion in spring. When Russia crossed the border, many of its mobile units found themselves stranded in fields and limited to major roads, where resistance and logistical issues significantly slowed the advance toward Kyiv and elsewhere.

See also 

 Cold-weather warfare
 Russian Winter

References 

Climate of Russia
Climate of Ukraine
Russian words and phrases